During the 1993–94 English football season, West Bromwich Albion F.C. competed in the Football League First Division.

Season summary
Following Ardiles' surprise departure, West Brom appointed his assistant Keith Burkinshaw to the manager's seat. The Baggies survived relegation back to Division Two at the end of the 1993–94 season, but only because they had scored more goals than rivals, Birmingham City. Safety was assured on the final day thanks to a 1–0 win over Portsmouth - Lee Ashcroft's goal sending the 10,000 strong army of fans in raptures.

Final league table

Results
West Bromwich Albion's score comes first

Legend

Football League First Division

FA Cup

League Cup

Anglo-Italian Cup

First-team squad
Squad at end of season

Notes

References

West Bromwich Albion F.C. seasons
West Bromwich Albion